Jitka Hanzlová (born 1958) is a Czech photographer, mostly known for her portraiture.

Biography
Hanzlová was born in 1958 in Nachod, Czechoslovakia. She claimed asylum in Germany in 1982 and settled in Essen. She studied photography and communication technology at the Folkwang University of the Arts in Essen. She lives and works in Germany.

Work
Hanzlová's first series Rokytnik, which documents the village inhabitants of the photographer's homeland, was made between 1990 and 1994.

Publications

Awards

1993: Otto Steinert Prize, German Society for Photography, Germany
1995: Scholarship DG BANK Frankfurt, Germany
1995: European Photography Award 1995, Germany
1998: Scholarship, Stiftung für Kunst und Kultur des Landes NRW, Düsseldorf, Germany
1999: Shortlisted for The Citibank Photography Prize 2000, London
2002: Shortlisted for The Citibank Photography Prize 2003, London
2003: Grand Prix Award – Project Grant 2003, Arles, France
2007: Paris Photo Prize for Contemporary Photography, France

Solo exhibitions
Scottish National Portrait Gallery, Edinburgh, 2012.
Between Continuum. Photography and film since 1990, Braunschweig, Germany, 2018.

Collections
Hanzlová's work is held in the following permanent collections:
Fotomuseum Winterthur, Winterthur, Switzerland: 16 prints (as of October 2018)
Museum of Modern Art, New York: 6 prints (as of October 2018)
National Galleries of Scotland: 3 prints (as of October 2018)
San Francisco Museum of Modern Art, San Francisco, CA: 2 prints (as of October 2018)
Stedelijk Museum Amsterdam: 20 prints (as of October 2018)

References

External links
 

Czech photographers
Czech women photographers
Czechoslovak emigrants to Germany
Living people
People from Náchod
1958 births
Artists from Essen